Los peores años de nuestra vida ( The Worst Years of Our Life) is a 1994 Spanish comedy film directed by Emilio Martínez Lázaro and written by David Trueba. The film was nominated for four Goya Awards, winning one.

Awards and nominations

Won
Goya Awards
Best Sound (Polo Aledo, José Antonio Bermúdez, Carlos Garrido and Gilles Ortion)

Nominated
Goya Awards
Best Actor in a Leading Role (Gabino Diego)
Best Actor in a Supporting Role (Agustín González)
Best Screenplay – Original (David Trueba)

External links
 

1994 films
1990s Spanish-language films
1990s English-language films
English-language Spanish films
1990s French-language films
1994 multilingual films
Spanish multilingual films
1990s Spanish films